PNU-22394 is a drug which acts as an agonist at serotonin 5-HT2 receptors, with strongest binding affinity for 5-HT2A and 5-HT2C and slightly weaker at 5-HT2B, although it is only a full agonist at 5-HT2C, but partial agonist at 5-HT2A and 5-HT2B. It has anorectic effects in both animal studies and human trials, along with "Pro-Cognitive Properties", although it has never been developed for medical use.

See also 
 Lorcaserin
 Tryptoline
 PNU-181731
 PHA-57378
 Tabernanthalog

References 

Serotonin receptor agonists
Azepines
Tryptamines